Nordic combined at the 2022 Winter Olympics was held at the Kuyangshu Nordic Center and Biathlon Center. The three events took place between 9 and 17 February 2022.

A total of 55 quota spots (all men) were distributed to the sport, the same as four years prior at the 2018 Winter Olympics. A total of three events for men were contested.

Qualification 

A total of 55 quota spots are available to athletes to compete at the games. A maximum of five athletes could be entered by any one National Olympic Committee. Competitors are eligible to compete if they have scored points at a World or Continental cup event during the qualification period of July 2020 to 16 January 2022. The top 55 on the Olympic quota allocation list respecting the maximum of four per country will qualify to compete.

Competition schedule 
The following is the competition schedule for all three events.

All times are (UTC+8).

Medal summary

Medal table

Medalists

Participating nations 
A total of 55 athletes (all men) from 18 nations (including the IOC's designation of ROC for the Russian Olympic Committee) qualified to participate.

The numbers in parenthesis represents the number of participants entered.

References

External links 
 Official Results Book – Nordic Combined

 
Nordic combined
2022
Olympics